Patrick Aloysius Alphonsus McGovern (October 14, 1872 – November 8, 1951) was an American prelate of the Roman Catholic Church. He served as bishop of the Diocese of Cheyenne in Wyoming from 1912 until his death in 1951.

Biography

Early life 
Patrick McGovern was born on October 14, 1872 in Omaha, Nebraska, the son of Patrick and Alice (McGearty) McGovern. After studying under the Sisters of Mercy, he graduated from Creighton University with a Bachelor of Arts degree in 1891. Having decided to enter the priesthood, McGovern enrolled at Mount St. Mary's Seminary in Cincinnati, Ohio.

Priesthood 
He was ordained to the priesthood for the Diocese of Omaha by Bishop Richard Scannell on August 18, 1895.  In 1898, McGovern was assigned to a pastoral position at St. Philomena's Cathedral Parish in Omaha.  While at St. Philomena, he also abolished tuition fees for the parochial school. After the cathedral building was sold, he was named to St. Peter's Parish in Omaha in 1907. He also served as a board member for the Associated Charities in the diocese

Bishop of Cheyenne 
On January 19, 1912, McGovern was appointed the fourth bishop of the Diocese of Cheyenne, by Pope Pius X. He received episcopal consecration on April 11, 1912. from Archbishop James Keane, with Bishops Scannel and Philip Garrigan serving as co-consecrators.  McGovern spent his first four months as bishop at a hospital, recovering from surgical treatment for a stomach ailment.

McGovern was given an honorary doctorate of laws from Creighton University in 1928 and established St. Joseph's Orphanage in Torrington, Wyoming on September 1, 1930. McGovern was made an assistant at the pontifical throne in 1937.

McGovern suffered a mental health crisis in 1940, requiring ten weeks' hospitalization. His self-confessed greatest accomplishment during his tenure was increasing the number of clergy servicing diocese; at the time of his arrival, there were only fourteen priests.  In 1941, McGovern published History of The Diocese of Cheyenne.

Death and legacy 
Patrick McGovern died in Cheyenne on November 8, 1951, at age 79.

References

External links
Diocese of Cheyenne

1872 births
1951 deaths
Creighton University alumni
The Athenaeum of Ohio alumni
Clergy from Omaha, Nebraska
Roman Catholic Archdiocese of Omaha
Roman Catholic bishops of Cheyenne
20th-century Roman Catholic bishops in the United States